The grassland mosaic-tailed rat, or grassland melomys (Melomys burtoni), is a species of rodent in the family Muridae. It is found in Australia and Papua New Guinea. In Australia it is found along the northern coast from Kimberley to New South Wales.  In the Top End it is often found in Pandanus (P. spiralis). Kunwinjku of western Arnhem Land call this animal mulbbu.

References

Melomys
Mammals of Western Australia
Mammals of the Northern Territory
Mammals of New South Wales
Mammals of Queensland
Rodents of Australia
Taxa named by Edward Pierson Ramsay
Mammals described in 1887
Taxonomy articles created by Polbot